Juhan af Grann (born 3 December 1944 in Kuopio, Finland as Heikki Juhani Grann, died 14 January 2023 in Espoo) was a Finnish film director and producer known for his UFO documentaries. His most notable documentary is Mankind's Last Exodus, released in 1998 and sold in over 120 countries.

Grann is noted for his interest in the topic of unidentified flying objects, but he is also known for outlandish promotion.


Filmography

Director
 Kun maailma paloi (1969)
 Ihminen tundrassa (1972)
 UKK – Luova valtiomies (1975)
 Luonnon luomaa (1977)
 A la Finlandia (1985)
 Visitors from Space (1992)
 UFOs & Paranormal Phenomena (1995)
 The New Apocalypse – Mankind's Last Exodus (1998)
 Intruders - They Have Always Been Here and Somebody Knows This Secret (2002)

Writer
 Ihminen tundrassa (1972)
 Luonnon luomaa (1977)
 Visitors from Space (1992)
 UFOs & Paranormal Phenomena (1995)
 The New Apocalypse: Mankind's Last Exodus (1998)
 Intruders: They Have Always Been Here and Somebody Knows This Secret (2002)

Producer
 Visitors from Space (1992)
 UFOs & Paranormal Phenomena (1995)
 The New Apocalypse: Mankind's Last Exodus (1998)
 Intruders: They Have Always Been Here and Somebody Knows This Secret (2002)

Selected Film Content

References

External links

 

Finnish film directors
1944 births
2023 deaths
People from Kuopio
Finnish conspiracy theorists